Hulet James Harrison Jr. (born September 10, 1948) is a former American football running back in the National Football League. He was drafted by the Chicago Bears in the second round of the 1971 NFL Draft. He played college football at Missouri.

References

1948 births
Living people
Players of American football from San Antonio
American football fullbacks
Missouri Tigers football players
Chicago Bears players
Brackenridge High School alumni